Susan Steinberg is an American television producer, writer, and director. She is sometimes credited as Sue Steinberg.

In 1991, she was won an Emmy Award. She was born in Chicago.

Credits

Producer, director, writer 
 Edward R. Murrow: This Reporter (1990) for American Masters PBS WNET/13 TV series; Emmy Award, Directors Guild of America Award.
 Paul Simon: Born at the Right Time (1993) for American Masters series.
 Plugging In (1995) - episode of The History of Rock 'n' Roll television series
 Segment Producer, Writer, and Director for several segments
 Don Hewitt: 90 Minutes on 60 Minutes (1998) for American Masters series
 Atlantic Records: The House That Ahmet Built (2007) for American Masters series
 Under the Knife (2019).

Editor: selected 
 Gimme Shelter (1970) Feature documentary directed by Albert and David Maysles and Charlotte Zwerin
 Cocksucker Blues (1972) Feature documentary directed by Robert Frank on the Rolling Stones
Rockers (1978), Jamaican reggae film
 Ray Charles: The Genius of Soul (1992) for American Masters PBS WNET/13 TV Series
 W. Eugen Smith: Photography Made Difficult  (1998) for American Masters PBS WNET/13 TV Series -Emmy Award

Writer 

 Gold Fever (1997) for American Experience series
 Famous Homes & Hideaways (2004) television series

Other 

Steinberg is one of the founding members of The Boston Film/Video Foundation (BF/VF).

References

External links
Official website
IMDb "Susan Steinberg"

American television directors
American television producers
American women television producers
American television writers
Emmy Award winners
American women television directors
Living people
American women television writers
Place of birth missing (living people)
Year of birth missing (living people)
21st-century American women